Jason Kennedy may refer to:

Jason Kennedy (footballer) (born 1986), British football player
Jason Kennedy (TV personality) (born 1981), American television personality, correspondent and co-anchor in E! News

See also
Jay Kennedy (1956–2007), American editor and writer